Patrick Kyaligonza (1960-2010) was an Anglican bishop in Uganda: he served as the Bishop of Rwenzori from 2009 to 2010.

Kyaligonza was born in Rwenyana and went to school in Mpanga. He studied for the priesthood at Bishop Balya Theological College. He served the church in  Kyenjojo, Bundibugyo and Kabarole. At different times he was also diocesan treasurer, education coordinator, diocesan secretary and Dean of St. John's Cathedral, Fort Portal.

References

21st-century Anglican bishops in Uganda
Anglican bishops of Rwenzori
Uganda Christian University alumni
2010 deaths
1960 births
People from Kamwenge District
Anglican deans in Africa
Alumni of Bishop Balya Theological College